Thomas Henry Handley (22 February 1886 – 4 August 1962), also known as Harry Handley, was an English professional footballer who played in the Football League for Birmingham and Bradford. He played as a half back.

Handley was born in the Cotteridge district of Birmingham, and played football for his works team, Kings Norton Metal Works, before joining Birmingham in 1907 as cover at half back. He made his debut in the First Division on Boxing Day 1907, replacing the injured Walter Wigmore for a game away at Notts County which finished goalless. Though he did not play again that season, he finished the 1908–09 season in the Second Division as first-choice centre-half, but was then unexpectedly allowed to leave. He signed for fellow Second Division club Bradford, where he spent two seasons.

References

1886 births
1962 deaths
Footballers from Birmingham, West Midlands
English footballers
Association football midfielders
Birmingham City F.C. players
Bradford (Park Avenue) A.F.C. players
English Football League players